Riccardo Garrone (1 November 1926 – 14 March 2016) was an Italian actor, voice actor and director.

Biography
Garrone began his acting career in 1949 and attended the Silvio d'Amico National Academy of Dramatic Arts. He appeared in more than 140 films from 1949 until his retirement in 2014. He made his debut in the film Adam and Eve directed by Mario Mattoli. He also worked in several theatre productions alongside other actors such as Vittorio Gassman, Diana Torrieri and Elena Zareschi. 

Garrone often portrayed characters with persuasive, polite personalities in a variety of B movie comedies, spaghetti-westerns and horrors. In the 1980s, he made frequent stage collaborations with Antonella Steni and he made more appearances on television. One of his most popular television roles was on Un medico in famiglia in which he portrayed Nicola Solari. He also had a recurring role on Amico mio starring Massimo Dapporto.

Garrone also worked occasionally as a voice actor and dubber.

Personal life
Garrone was married to Grazia Maria Verità and they had one daughter, Francesca. Garrone was also the younger brother of director Sergio Garrone. He retired in 2014. 

Garrone died in Milan on 14 March 2016 at the age of 89.

Selected filmography

 Adam and Eve (1949) - Pistolero sudista (uncredited)
 Torment of the Past (1952) - Complice di Bianchi
 Brothers of Italy (1952)
 I sette dell'Orsa maggiore (1953)
 Two Nights with Cleopatra (1954) - Ufficiale delle guardie (uncredited)
 Woman of Rome (1954) - Giancarlo
 Il Bidone (1955) - Riccardo
 La rossa (1955) - Pierre
 Una sera di maggio (1955)
 Helen of Troy (1956) - Minor Role (uncredited)
 Guardia, guardia scelta, brigadiere e maresciallo (1956) - The Driver into No-Parking Area
 The Railroad Man (1956) - L'amico di Marcello (uncredited)
 Una voce, una chitarra, un po' di luna (1956) - Mario
 Il prezzo della gloria (1956) - capo macchinista Morabito
 Addio sogni di gloria (1957)
 Fathers and Sons (1957) - Carlo Corallo (uncredited)
 The Most Wonderful Moment (1957) - Il dottor Benvenuti
 Doctor and the Healer (1957) - Sergeant
 Lazzarella (1957) - Sandra's father
 Pretty But Poor (1957) - Franco
 L'ultima violenza (1957) - Giorgio Carani
 Love and Chatter (1958) - Il telecronista
 Le dritte (1958) - Lello
 Venice, the Moon and You (1958) - Don Fulgenzio
 Caporale di giornata (1958) - The Lieutenant
 The Friend of the Jaguar (1959) - Il rappresentante
 My Wife's Enemy (1959) - Michele
 Ciao, ciao bambina! (1959) - Guido Branca
 La cento chilometri (1959) - Cesare Malabrocca
 Audace colpo dei soliti ignoti (1959) - Virgilio, 'Il milanese'
 Nel blu dipinto di blu (1959) - "Tre Stecche"
 La Dolce Vita (1960) - Riccardo
 The Loves of Salammbo (1960) - Hamilcar
 Gentlemen Are Born (1960) - Enzo
 The Warrior Empress (1960) - Hyperbio
 The Traffic Policeman (1960) - Il tenente dei vigili
 Madri pericolose (1960) - Count Massimo Soderini
 Girl with a Suitcase (1961) - Romolo
 Captain Fracasse (1961) - Lampourde
 Laura nuda (1961) - Alvise
 Cronache del '22 (1961)
 Day by Day, Desperately (1961) - Dottore
 Caccia all'uomo (1961) - Commissario Nardelli
 Cacciatori di dote (1961) - Manlio
 Fra' Manisco cerca guai (1961) - Don Liborio
 Pontius Pilate (1962) - Galba
 Peccati d'estate (1962) - Toni
 Eva (1962) - Michele - a player
 Swordsman of Siena (1962) - Don Carlos
 The Legion's Last Patrol (1962) - Paolo
 I Don Giovanni della Costa Azzurra (1962) - Protettore di Assuntina
 The Reunion (1963) - Sandrino
 Il successo (1963) - Ex fidanzato di Laura
 La pupa (1963) - Barone
 I terribili 7 (1963) - Giornalista
 Il treno del sabato (1964) - Riccardo
 Let's Talk About Women (1964)
 Amore facile (1964) - Carlo (segment "Una casa rispettabile")
 The Yellow Rolls-Royce (1964) - Bomba
 2 mattacchioni al Moulin Rouge (1964) - Proprietario locale
 I due pericoli pubblici (1964) - Il Barone
 Terror-Creatures from the Grave (1965) - Joseph Morgan
 Two Sergeants of General Custer (1965) - Specialista
 I complessi (1965) - Alvaro Morandini (segment "Una Giornata decisiva")
 Idoli controluce (1965) - Arturo Baldi
 I soldi (1965)
 Spiaggia libera (1966) - Riccardo
 Deguejo (1966) - Foran
 Le voyage du père (1966) - Un voyageur
 Maigret a Pigalle (1966) - La Pointe
 Three Bites of the Apple (1967) - Croupier
 The Seventh Floor (1967) - The Barber
 How to Kill 400 Duponts (1967) - Vladimiro Dupont
 Bang Bang Kid (1967) - Killer Kossock
 Un colpo da re (1967) - Moulin Rouge
 Se vuoi vivere... spara! (1968) - Donovan
 The Killer Likes Candy (1968) - Nicolo
 Madigan's Millions (1968) - Matteo Cirini
 La vuole lui... lo vuole lei (1968) - Ferruccio
 I ragazzi di Bandiera Gialla (1968) - Pizzini, the Producer
 Il ragazzo che sorride (1969) - Father of Livia
 A Noose for Django (1969) - Mr. Fargo
 Oh, Grandmother's Dead (1969) - Galeazzo Ghia
 Death Knocks Twice (1969) - Amato Locatelli
 Pensando a te (1969)
 The Avenger, Zorro (1969) - Albert Pison
 How Did a Nice Girl Like You Get Into This Business? (1970) - Olivetti
 La colomba non deve volare (1970)
 Il divorzio (1970) - Umberto
 A Girl Called Jules (1970) - Carvalli
 A Man Called Sledge (1970) - The Warden
 Basta guardarla (1970) - Pediconi
 Mazzabubù... quante corna stanno quaggiù? (1971) - Agilulfo, the crusader
 Grazie zio, ci provo anch'io (1971) - Agente X-15
 Trastevere (1971) - Il produttore (scenes deleted)
 A Girl in Australia (1971) - Giuseppe Bartoni
 Siamo tutti in libertà provvisoria (1971)
 Cerco de terror (1972) - Doctor Warren
 Decameron proibitissimo (Boccaccio mio statte zitto) (1972) - Count Guidobaldo
 La bella Antonia, prima Monica e poi Dimonia (1972) - Giovanni Piccolomini
 Return of Halleluja (1972) - Zagaya
 Sting of the West (1972) - Sheriff
 What Am I Doing in the Middle of a Revolution? (1972) - Peppino
 Decameroticus (1972) - Gerbino
 Maria Rosa la guardona (1973)
 Giovannona Long-Thigh (1973) - Robertuzzo
 Rugantino (1973) - Il Principe
 Il figlioccio del padrino (1973) - Petruzzo
 4 marmittoni alle grandi manovre (1974) - Tenente Spezzini
 Il bacio di una morta (1974) - On. Lampedusa
 Di Tresette ce n'è uno, tutti gli altri son nessuno (1974) - Frisco Joe / Tutti Frutti
 Scusi, si potrebbe evitare il servizio militare?... No! (1974)
 L'eredità dello zio buonanima (1974) - Notaio Potenza
 La mafia mi fa un baffo (1974) - Police Manager (uncredited)
 The Silkworm (1974) - Commissario Guarnieri
 Il fidanzamento (1975) - Vincenzo - brother of Luigi
 The Cursed Medallion (1975) - Police Inspector
 The Loves and Times of Scaramouche (1976) - Citoyen Capitain
 Confessions of a Lady Cop (1976) - Federico Innocenti, detto 'Borotalco
 La sposina (1976) - Arnaldi
 La campagnola bella (1976)
 The Cynic, the Rat and the Fist (1977) - Natali
 La vergine, il toro e il capricorno (1977) - Enrica's Husband
 Rene the Cane (1977) - Karl
 Peccatori di provincia (1977) - Zito / Lawyer
 The Cricket (1980) - Ermete
 Don't Play with Tigers (1982) - Admiral Olderisi
 Odd Squad (1983) - Tenente Rondi
 Vacanze di Natale (1983) - Giovanni Covelli
 Fantozzi subisce ancora (1983) - Ragionier Calboni
 Amarsi un po' (1984) - Principe Cellini
 Windsurf - Il vento nelle mani (1984) - Anacleto Stella
 My First Forty Years (1987)
 Paprika (1991) - Zio
 A Cold, Cold Winter (1996) - Avv. Rossi Mannelli
 Simpatici & antipatici (1998) - Fausto
 The Dinner (1998) - Diomede
 I fobici (1999) - Carlo's father (segment "Ho chiuso il gas?") (voice, uncredited)
 At the Right Moment (2000) - Direttore TG
 Padre Pio: Between Heaven and Earth (2000, TV Movie) - Eminenza
 Arresti domiciliari (2000)
 I Love You Eugenio (2002) - Maresciallo
 Amore 14 (2009) - Tommaso
 La città invisibile (2010) - Nonno Carmine
 La legge è uguale per tutti... forse (2014) - Barbone

References

External links

1926 births
2016 deaths
Italian male film actors
Italian male voice actors
Italian male television actors
Italian male stage actors
Italian film directors
Male actors from Rome
20th-century Italian male actors
Nastro d'Argento winners
People of Lazian descent
Accademia Nazionale di Arte Drammatica Silvio D'Amico alumni